{{Infobox television
| image         = Little Shop Title Card.jpg
| runtime       = 30 min.
| creator       = 
| based_on      = 'The Little Shop of Horrors byCharles B. Griffith
| developer     = Mark Edward EdensEllen Levy-Sarnoff
| composer      = Haim SabanShuki Levy
| executive_producer     = Haim SabanJoe TariteroWinston RichardEllen-Levy Sarnoff
| starring      = 
| country       = 
| company       = 
| distributor   = Saban International
| network       = 
| first_aired   = 
| last_aired    = 
| num_seasons   = 1
| num_episodes  = 13
| list_episodes = 
}}Little Shop is a 1991 animated fantasy comedy television series that aired on Saturday mornings on the Fox Kids TV network, about a teenager and a giant talking plant. Little Shop was based on the 1960 Roger Corman film The Little Shop of Horrors''; Corman served as a consultant. The concept of the adaptation is credited to Ellen Levy and Mark Edward Edens, and the series was produced by Tom Tataranowicz. The horror elements in previous versions of the story, in which characters are eaten by the plant, are toned down for children in this series.

Ownership of the series passed to Disney in 2001 when Disney acquired Fox Kids Worldwide, which also includes Marvel Productions. The series is not available on Disney+.

Synopsis
Self-proclaimed nerd Seymour Krelborn, an adolescent boy who works in a flower shop, is friends with a talking Venus flytrap named Junior. Junior sprouts from a 200-million-year-old seed and has the ability to talk and hypnotize people. Only Seymour is aware of Junior's abilities. The flower shop is owned by stodgy Mr. Mushnik, whose daughter Audrey is the object of Seymour's affections. Audrey, however, is unaware of Seymour's feelings towards her. Buck-toothed Paine Driller, a neighborhood bully, continuously targets Seymour.

Episodes focus on the pubescent exploits of the leads and frequently feature a moral. They also feature a couple of musical numbers per episode. Consistent with the "urban" persona of the plant in the musical, Audrey Junior raps in the series during his numbers, and speaks in a hip-hop dialect. Also featured are a trio of singing flowers reminiscent of Crystal, Ronette, and Chiffon (the three chorus girls in the musical).

Differences between the film and series
The young human characters are 13-years-old, and there are musical segments in each episode. Junior is a kind-hearted plant, rather than a man-eating alien; and hatched from a prehistoric Earth plant that has been dormant for over 200 million years. Although Junior does have a voracious appetite, this version of him would very rarely (and only off screen) feast on human blood. The plant retains its ability to hypnotize people, as it did in the film, as well as the ability to telekinetically manipulate plants and objects made from plant-based materials. Junior sometimes aids Seymour without his knowledge, sometimes by using his hypnotic abilities. However, he does insult Seymour from time to time, for example, calling him a "meathead" or "pest", and saying he'd "rather be talking to a termite".

Brace-faced neighborhood bully Paine Driller replaces the character of Orin Scrivello, the dentist. Audrey, Seymour's love interest, is a bow-wearing brunette who is always thinking about what job she wants when she grows up. She is the daughter of Mr. Mushnik in this version.

Episodes

Cast

Speaking voices
Marlow Vella as Seymour Krelborn
Tamar Lee as Audrey Mushnick
Harvey Atkin as Mr. Mushnick
Buddy Lewis as Audrey Junior
David Huband as Paine Driller

Singing voices
 Terry "Proffet" McGee as Audrey Junior
 Lisa Paulette and Jana Lexxa as Seymour Krelborn
 Jennie Kwan as Audrey Mushnick
 Mark Ryan-Martin as Paine Driller
 Michael Rawl as Mr. Mushnick

Additional voices
 Tara Charendoff
 Don Francks
 Dan Hennessey
 Rick Jones
 Tracey Moore
 Stephen Ouimette
 Ron Rubin
 Linda Sorenson
 Robert Tinkler
 Danny Wells

Crew
 Roger Corman – Creative Consultant
 Stu Rosen – Voice Director
 Jamie Simone – Dialogue Editor

References

External links
 

Little Shop of Horrors
1990s American animated television series
1990s American workplace comedy television series
1991 American television series debuts
1991 American television series endings
1990s French animated television series
1991 French television series debuts
1991 French television series endings
American children's animated comedy television series
American children's animated fantasy television series
American children's animated musical television series
Animated television shows based on films
Fox Kids
French children's animated comedy television series
French children's animated fantasy television series
French children's animated musical television series
Fox Broadcasting Company original programming
Television series by 20th Century Fox Television
Television series by Marvel Productions
Television series by Saban Entertainment
Television shows set in New Jersey